Zwölferkogel is the name of various mountains, all in Austria:

 Zwölferkogel (Stubai Alps) (2,988 m), Tyrol

 Zwölferkogel (Totes Gebirge) (2,099 m), a prominent mountain of the Alps, in Styria/Upper Austria

See also
 Zwölferkofel, a peak of the Sexten Dolomites